Sankat Mochan Hanuman Temple is a Hindu temple in Varanasi, Uttar Pradesh, India and is dedicated to the Hindu God Hanuman. The temple was established by famous Hindu preacher and poet saint Sri Goswami Tulsidas in the early 16th century and is situated on the banks of the Assi river. The deity was named "Sankat Mochan" meaning  the "reliever from troubles".

In the temple, offerings to Lord Hanuman (called Prasad) are sold like the special sweet "besan ke ladoo", which the devotees relish; the idol is also decked with a pleasant marigold flower garland as well. This temple has the unique distinction of having Lord Hanuman facing his Lord, Rama, whom he worshipped with steadfast and selfless devotion.

History
It is believed that the temple has been built on the very spot where Tulsidas had a vision of Hanuman. Sankat Mochan Temple was founded by Tulsidas who was the author of the Ramacharitamanasa, which is the greatest version of lord Ram story written in Avadhi ("Most of the people having confusion that Ramacharitamanasa is a avadhi version of Valmiki Ramayana but Ramacharitamanasa is different from Sanskrit Ramayana written by rishi Valmiki as Baba Tulsidas Ji already told in Ramacharitamanasa that "Nana bhanti Ram avatara, Ramayan sat koti apara" means in each Kalp lord Ram takes Avatar & plays different-2 lilas(Act) so we have different stories of same lord Ram").Tradition promises that regular visitors to the temple will gain the special favor of Lord Hanuman. Every Tuesday and Saturday thousands of people queue up in front of the temple to offer prayers to Lord Hanuman. According to Vedic Astrology, Hanuman saves human beings from the anger of the planet Shani (Saturn), and especially people who have an ill-placed Saturn in their horoscopes visit this temple for astrological remedies. This is supposed to be the most effective way for appeasing Shani. While it is suggested that Hanuman did not hesitate to engulfs in his mouth the sun, the lord of all planets, which humbled all the gods and angels, making them worship him for the Sun's release. Some astrologers believe that worshiping Hanuman can neutralize the ill-effect of Mangal (Mars) and practically any planet that has an ill effect on human life. It is believed that Tulsidas is believed to have written most of the verses of Ramacharitramanas in this temple.

Terrorist incident

On 7 March 2006, one of three explosions hit the temple while the aarti was in progress in which numerous worshippers and wedding attendees were participating. The crowd helped each other in the rescue operation after the explosion. The next day a large number of devotees resumed their worship as usual.

Temple today
The temple still continues to be attended by thousands of Rama and Hanuman devotees who chant Hanuman Chalisa and Sundarkand (also provided in the form of a booklet in the temple for free). After the terrorist incident of 2006, a permanent police post was set up inside the temple.

Sankat Mochan temple is near the Banaras Hindu University.

Sankat Mochan Foundation

The Sankat Mochan Foundation (SMF) was established in 1982 by Veer Bhadra Mishra, the Mahant (High priest) of the temple, and has been working for cleaning and protecting the Ganges river. Its projects are funded in part by aid from the U. S. and Swedish governments. Mishra was formerly former Head of the Civil Engineering Department at the Indian Institute of Technology (BHU) Varanasi [IIT(BHU)] and was awarded United Nations Environment Programme (UNEP) established the "Global 500 Roll of Honour" in 1992, and later the TIME magazine's "Hero of the Planet" award in 1999.

The foundation has been working with Australia-based environmental group, Oz Greene, under a programme called "Swatcha Ganga Abhiyan" for over 25 years. It celebrated its silver jubilee on 3–4 November 2007, with two-day event which concluded at the Tulsi Ghat, on the Ganges.

Sankat Mochan Sangeet Samaroh

Each year in the month of April, the temple organizes a classical music and dance concert festival titled "Sankat Mochan Sangeet Samaroh", in which musicians and performers from all over India take part. The first festival was organized 88 years ago, and it has invited musicians and dancers including Odissi guru Kelucharan Mahapatra, who was associated since its early days. In fact he was instrumental in starting women's participation in the festival with Sanjukta Panigrahi, Swapna Sundari and Kankana Banerjee.

In 2009, the six-day concert saw over 35 artists including, vocalist Jasraj and Kathak exponent Birju Maharaj.

The 2010 concert was spread over five days, during which artists such as Jasraj, Sunanda Patnaik, Channulal Mishra, Rajan-Sajan Mishra and Amar Nath Mishra performed.

In 2015 concert Pakistani-ghazal singer Ghulam Ali performed at Sankat Mochan Sangeet Samaroh.

See also
Sankat Mochan Temple, Shimla
Hindu temples in Varanasi

References

External links

 Web India - Places of interest in Varanasi
 Sankat Mochan Foundation, Official website
 BBC - High priest horrified by blast BBC News
Images
 Image of the main gate of temple
 interior view

Hanuman temples
Tourist attractions in Varanasi
Hindu temples in Varanasi